Reinhard Hillebrand (March 10, 1810 – September 13, 1887) was an American politician that served in the Texas Senate for District 26. He was a Radical Republican.

Personal life
Reinhard Hillebrand was born on March 10, 1810, in Germany. According to the 1880 United States Census Hillebrand was a widowed farmer who lived in Fayette County, Texas. He died on September 13, 1887.

Political career
Hillebrand had experience as a county judge in 1869 prior to being elected to the Texas Senate, and he had been imprisoned during the American Civil War by the Confederates. His predecessor E.L. Alford had been banished from the Texas Senate and the Republican Party. Hillebrand won his seat in a special election to represent Texas Senate, District 26, he was a Radical Republican.

References

1810 births
1887 deaths
Texas Republicans